The second competition weekend of the 2022–23 ISU Speed Skating World Cup was held at Thialf in Heerenveen, the Netherlands, from Friday, 18 November, until Sunday, 20 November 2022.

Medal summary

Men's events

 In mass start, race points are accumulated during the race based on results of the intermediate sprints and the final sprint. The skater with most race points is the winner.

Women's events

 In mass start, race points are accumulated during the race based on results of the intermediate sprints and the final sprint. The skater with most race points is the winner.

Results

Men's events

500 m
The race started on 19 November 2022 at 15:26.

1000 m
The race started on 18 November 2022 at 18:48.

1500 m
The race started on 20 November 2022 at 13:30.

5000 m
The race started on 19 November 2022 at 16:05.

Mass start
The race started on 18 November 2022 at 19:55.

Team sprint
The race started on 20 November 2022 at 15:45.

Women's events

500 m
The race started on 20 November 2022 at 14:10.

1000 m
The race started on 18 November 2022 at 18:13.

1500 m
The race started on 19 November 2022 at 14:45.

3000 m
The race started on 20 November 2022 at 14:49.

Mass start
The race started on 18 November 2022 at 19:37.

Team sprint
The race started on 19 November 2022 at 17:19.

References

ISU World Cup, 2022–23, 2

2
ISU Speed Skating World Cup, 2022–23, World Cup 2
ISU
ISU